This is a list of Xbox 360 games that were released via retail disc, digital download or as part of the Xbox Live Arcade (XBLA) program. There are 2154 games across both lists.

A–L

M–Z

See also

 List of best-selling Xbox 360 video games
 List of Xbox 360 System Link games
 List of Xbox games compatible with Xbox 360
 List of Xbox games on Windows Phone

Notes

External links
 A list with screens and videos for cancelled Xbox 360 games and prototypes
 List of cancelled Xbox 360 video games

Xbox 360